Stephen Harold Tobolowsky (born May 30, 1951) is an American character actor. He is known for film roles such as insurance agent Ned Ryerson in Groundhog Day and amnesiac Sammy Jankis in Memento, as well as such television characters as Commissioner Hugo Jarry (Deadwood), Bob Bishop (Heroes), Sandy Ryerson (Glee), Stu Beggs (Californication and White Famous), "Action" Jack Barker (Silicon Valley), Dr. Leslie Berkowitz (One Day at a Time), and Principal Earl Ball (The Goldbergs).

Tobolowsky has a monthly audio podcast, The Tobolowsky Files, of autobiographical stories of his acting and personal life. In 2015, he co-hosted a short-lived second podcast, Big Problems – An Advice Podcast, with David Chen. He has also authored three books: The Dangerous Animals Club, Cautionary Tales, and My Adventures With God.

Early life and education
Tobolowsky was born in Dallas, Texas, into a Jewish family from Russia and Poland.

He grew up creating imaginative games with his brother, and his story The Dangerous Animals Club paints a picture of how unsupervised children in the 20th century could amuse themselves. He showed talent at baseball, but a serious childhood illness ended his career as an athlete before it began.  He graduated from Justin F. Kimball High School and Southern Methodist University. He received a master's degree from the University of Illinois in 1975.

He is a cousin of former Dallas attorney Ira Tobolowsky, who was murdered in his home in 2016 by a disgruntled former litigant. Another cousin (and Ira's brother) is the sculptor George Tobolowsky.

Stephen Tobolowsky also played in a band called A Cast of Thousands, which had two songs, "Red, White and Blue" and "I Heard a Voice Last Night", on a compilation of local Dallas bands called A New Hi. Both of these songs featured Steve Vaughan on guitar, who would be later known as Stevie Ray Vaughan.

Career
Tobolowsky has appeared in over 200 films, plus many television projects. He has also worked in the theater, directing and acting in plays in New York City, San Francisco, and Los Angeles. He directed one film, Two Idiots in Hollywood, based on his play of the same name. He also co-wrote the film True Stories with David Byrne and Beth Henley. He was nominated for a Tony Award for Best Performance by a Featured Actor in a Play for the 2002 revival of Morning’s at Seven.

On October 29, 2009, Tobolowsky started a new podcast on /Film called The Tobolowsky Files, where he tells stories, in a similar fashion to Tobolowsky's film Stephen Tobolowsky's Birthday Party. The show was picked up by Public Radio International in 2012.

Filmography

Film

Television

Discography
 Glee discography

Stage appearances
Selected stage appearances

Writing credits

Directing credits

References

External links

 
 
 

1951 births
Living people
20th-century American male actors
21st-century American male actors
20th-century American dramatists and playwrights
American male film actors
American male stage actors
American male television actors
American male voice actors
American people of Polish-Jewish descent
American people of Russian-Jewish descent
American podcasters
Jewish American male actors
Male actors from Dallas
Southern Methodist University alumni
Writers from Dallas
21st-century American Jews